Cantrainea sunderlandi is a species of small sea snail with calcareous opercula, a marine gastropod mollusk in the family Colloniidae.

Description

Original description: "Shell thick, solid, turbinate in shape; spire elevated with stepped appearance; shoulder very sharply angled, carinated; area between shoulder carina and suture flattened, distinctly tabulate; body whorls and spire whorls sculptured with numerous fine, smooth, spiral threads; outer edge of lip thickened, flaring; columella and base well-developed, white in color; interior and periphery of aperture nacreous; shell color pale straw-tan; operculum oval, smooth, shelly, white in color."

The shell grows to a height of 16 mm.

Distribution
Locus typicus: "Roatan Island, Honduras."

This species occurs in the Caribbean Sea off Honduras.

References

External links
 To World Register of Marine Species

Colloniidae
Gastropods described in 1987